Dearest Christian, I'm So Very Sorry for Bringing You Here. Love, Dad is the fourth studio album by American musical duo P.M. Dawn. It was released on October 6, 1998, by Gee Street and V2 Records. The album's title refers to bandmember Attrell Cordes' newborn son, named Christian.

Critical reception 
In a contemporary review, Rolling Stone magazine called Dearest Christian "a bleak record that contains the duo's smoothest work since 1993's The Bliss Album...?" and "a masterfully romantic album with no stomach for rhapsodic lies."  Keith Phipps of The A.V. Club wrote that the album "confirms the group as one of the most extraordinarily novel acts around." Robert Christgau, writing in The Village Voice, felt that Prince Be composed better as an R&B songwriter for the album than on Jesus Wept and stated, "with a steady band, a sometime collaborator, and the occasional borrowed riff, he revives his spaced-out spirituality as music if not commodity, transfiguring his grumpy disillusion with melodies, vocal harmonies, and now also guitar parts, all lovingly designed to convince his son Christian to be here now."

In a negative review, NME magazine found the music boring and described it as "fluffy-smooth to the point of suffocation; so unswervingly gushy it quickly drives you to distraction." In a retrospective review, AllMusic's Ned Raggett said that some of the songs sound derivative of one another, but that the album "contains beauty, ambition, good songs, rich production, and more, enough to justify its existence when so many of the band's peers had run themselves into the ground."

Track listing
All songs written by Attrell Cordes, except where noted.

Singles

I HAD NO RIGHT (1998)

US CD single
I Had No Right  5.01
As Disappointing As Your Mercy Is  4.15

US CD promo
I Had No Right (Radio Edit)  4.16
I Had No Right  5.01
I Had No Right (Instrumental)  4.16

US CD promo
I Had No Right (Radio Edit)  4.16
I Had No Right  5.01
I Had No Right (Hook)
I Had No Right (Instrumental)

UK CD single
I Had No Right (Radio Edit)  4.16
I Had No Right  5.01
As Disappointing As Your Mercy Is  4.15
Gotta Be...Movin' On Up (Morales Radio Remix)  4.06

UK CD promo
I Had No Right (Radio Edit)  4.16
Set Adrift On Memory Bliss (Edit)  3.45
I'd Die Without You (Edit)  4.00
Looking Through Patient Eyes  4.09

FAITH IN YOU (1998)

US CD promo
Faith In You (J.J. Remix Radio Edit)  3.48
Faith In You (J.J. Flores Original Remix)  4.29
Faith In You (Album Radio Edit)

UK CD single

Faith In You (Radio Edit) 3.36
Faith In You (J.J. Flores Original Remix) 4.29
Faith In You (Remix) 5:10

ART DECO HALOS (1998)

UK CD promo

Art Deco Halos (Radio Edit) 3:27
Art Deco Halos (Vocal Mix) 5:33
I Had No Right (Hook)

References

External links 
 

1998 albums
P.M. Dawn albums
Gee Street Records albums
V2 Records albums